Marion Elizabeth Adnams (3 December 1898 – 24 October 1995) was an English painter, printmaker and draughtswoman. She is notable for her surrealist paintings, in which apparently unconnected objects appear together in unfamiliar, often outdoor, environments. Some of her paintings depict landscapes and landmarks close to, or within, her native town of Derby.

Biography 

Adnams was born on 3 December 1898 at 22 Otter Street, Derby, the only daughter of John Frederick Adnams and his wife, Mary Elizabeth Smith. Her artistic interests were encouraged from an early age by her father, himself a woodwork teacher at Derby School. After attending Parkfield Cedars School in Derby, she expressed a desire to study art but was instead urged to go on and study at University College, Nottingham, where she obtained a Bachelor of Arts in Modern Languages in 1919. Between 1927 and 1930, Adnams travelled to Belgium, France, and Italy, executing woodcuts of the architecture she encountered en route, and exhibiting them to some acclaim at Derby Art Gallery and elsewhere locally with the Derby Women's Art Club. She began her career not as a language teacher, but as art mistress at Derby's Central School for Girls before being recommended for a transfer to the newly opened Homelands Grammar School for Girls, by the Derbyshire Education Committee, in October 1937. She was appointed senior lecturer at Derby Diocesan Training College in 1948, where she rose to become Head of Art.

Between 1938 and 1970, Adnams painted the surrealist works for which she is principally known, exhibiting at the British Art Centre in London, alongside Duncan Grant, Augustus John, Henry Moore, Jacob Epstein, and Eileen Agar. In 1944 she exhibited her work at the Modern Art Gallery in London, alongside Jack Bilbo and Max Ernst. In 1939, Adnams sold her first painting, The Living Tree (1939), to Manchester Art Gallery for inclusion in their Rutherson Collection of Modern Art for Schools. Further sales of her paintings to Derby Art Gallery from 1945 and to the Salford Museum and Art Gallery and Nottingham Castle Museums from the early 1950s have ensured her work a measure of public presence.

Adnams retired in 1960 aged sixty-one, using her time to develop her art in new directions. She acquired a second home in France, producing paintings and drawings influenced by the landscape of Provence and elsewhere. In 1966 she painted a series of murals for the Immanuel Church in Stapenhill, near Burton upon Trent. In 1968, at the age of seventy, she became partially blind. As her condition worsened, she was left unable to paint. She died in Derby on Tuesday 24 October 1995, aged ninety-six years old. Her funeral was held at Derby Cathedral on Thursday 2 November 1995, before burial at Nottingham Road Cemetery in Derby.

Exhibitions 
 1939: First Exhibition of Paintings, Sculptures, and Watercolours by Members of the British Art Centre, at the Stafford Gallery, London
 1940: People and Flowers: the Fourth Exhibition of the British Art Centre, at the Stafford Gallery, London
 1940: Limelight, at the Stafford Gallery, London
 1943: Northern Artists Exhibition, at Manchester Art Gallery
 1944: 'The World of Imagination' An Exhibition of 'Oodles', Abstracts, Surrealism, 'Merz'-Sculpture, Constructivism and Symbolism, at the Modern Art Gallery Limited, London
 1971: Marion Adnams: a Retrospective Exhibition of Paintings and Drawings, at the Midland Group Gallery in Nottingham
 1995: British and European Surrealism, at Wolverhampton Art Gallery and Museum
 2009: Angels of Anarchy: Women Artists and Surrealism, at Manchester Art Gallery
 2011: Three Stones in the City of Ladies, at Nottingham Castle Museum
 2017: John Armstrong: Dream and Reality, at The Atkinson, Southport
 2017-8 Marion Adnams - A Singular Woman at Derby Museum and Art Gallery, Derby
 2019:   50/50; Fifty Works by Fifty British Women Artists 1900 – 1950 curated by Sacha Llewellyn, London and Leeds
 2019:   British Surrealism curated by David Boyd Haycock, Dulwich Picture Gallery

Legacy 
Adnam's work can be found in numerous public art collections, including those of Manchester Art Gallery, Salford Museums, Nottingham Castle Museum and Art Gallery, Leicestershire County Council, and the Scottish National Gallery of Modern Art. The largest public collection of her work is with the Derby Museums Trust.

In 2011, the British milliner Stephen Jones designed and created a range of hats, titled Drifting and Dreaming, inspired by the work of Marion Adnams.

See also 
 Women Surrealists

References

External links 
 Exhibition Marion Adnams: A Singular Woman, held (between 2 December 2017 - 4 March 2018) at Museum & Art Gallery Derby Derby Museum Free Home
 Biography Marion Adnams at Art UK
 Marion Adnams is being presented on the website National Galleries Scotland

1898 births
1995 deaths
20th-century English women artists
20th-century English painters
Alumni of the University of Nottingham
British muralists
British surrealist artists
English women painters
People from Derby
Women printmakers
Women surrealist artists